Van Rijn is a Dutch toponymic surname meaning "from (the) Rhine river". Common spelling variations are Van Rhijn and the anglicized version Van Ryn. People with this surname include:

Van Rijn
Anna van Rijn (ca.1512–1607), Dutch philanthropist
Rembrandt van Rijn (1606–1669), Dutch painter and etcher
Titus van Rijn (1641–1668), single surviving child of Rembrandt and Saskia van Uylenburgh
Guido van Rijn (born 1950), Dutch blues and gospel historian 
Martin van Rijn (born 1956), Dutch business leader and politician 
Karen van Rijn (born 1960s), Dutch cricketer
Wilma van Rijn née van Hofwegen (born 1971), Dutch freestyle swimmer
Rolf van Rijn (born 1972), Dutch basketball player
Van Reijn
Theo van Reijn (1884–1954), Dutch sculptor
Van Rhijn
Johannes Jacobus van Rhijn (1742-1808), Old Catholic Archbishop of Utrecht
Pieter Johannes van Rhijn (1886–1960), Dutch astronomer
2203 van Rhijn (asteroid) and Van Rhijn (crater) named after him
 (1890–1971), South African politician and diplomat
 (1892-1986), Dutch government minister and state secretary
Willem van Rhijn (1903–1979), Dutch modern pentathlete
 (born 1931), Dutch footballer
Lia van Rhijn (born 1953), Dutch ceramist and sculptor
Marlou van Rhijn (born 1991), Dutch Paralympic sprint runner
Ricardo van Rhijn (born 1991), Dutch footballer
Van Rhyn
Ernst van Rhyn (born 1997), South African rugby player
Van Ryn
John Van Ryn (1905–1999), American tennis player
Marjorie Van Ryn née Gladman (1908-1999), American tennis player 
Ben Van Ryn (born 1971), American baseball player
Mike Van Ryn (born 1979), Canadian ice hockey player
Laura Van Ryn (1984–2006), American car crash victim with mistaken identity

Fictional characters
Nicholas van Rijn (2376 to c. 2500 AD), main character in Poul Anderson's science fiction novels

See also
Van der Ryn, surname of same origin
Vanryn, extraterrestrials from the planet Ryn in the science fiction novel The Haunted Stars
Anna van Rijn College, Dutch secondary school named after Anna fvan Rijn (1512–1607)
Van Ryn & DeGelleke, American architectural firm co-founded by Henry J. Van Ryn (1864–1951)

References

Dutch-language surnames
Surnames of Dutch origin

nl:Van Rijn